Daniel Ellis (born 7 October 1988) is an Australian sprint cyclist. He was part of the Australian team that won the team sprint at the 2007 World Cup in Sydney. He is an Australian Institute of Sport scholarship holder.

Ellis was selected as a team member representing Australia at the 2008 Summer Olympics in Beijing, with Ryan Bayley and Mark French. They qualified for the final ride-off for the bronze medal. After a strong start, they faded and finished fourth, missing a medal by 0.008 second.

 
 
Ellis began competitive cycling at age 10. He attended Dickson College in Canberra.

As of July 2010 Ellis lives in Seaton, South Australia.

Honors and medals
2008 ACTAS Sportstar of the year
2005 ACT Sportstar of the Month (February)
2005 ACT Sportsart of the Month (January) - Special Achievement Award
2004 Stephen Hodge Achievement Award

Australian Teams
2013 Oceania Championships NZL
2010 Oceania Championships NZL
2009 Track World Championships POL
2008 Olympic Games CHN
2008 Track World Championships GBR
2006 Junior Track World Championships BEL
2005 Junior Track World Championships AUT

Results

2013
2nd Team Sprint Oceania Track Championships NZL

2010
1st Highbury Homes Westral Wheel Race Perth Winter Track Grand Prix WA
1st Flying 200m Sprint Perth Winter Track Grand Prix WA
1st Final 200m Sprint Perth Winter Track Grand Prix WA
1st Sprint Oceania Championships NZL
1st Sprint Australian Track Championships SA
1st Team Sprint Australian Track Championships SA
2nd Keirin Perth Winter Track Grand Prix WA
2nd Keirin Australian Track Championships SA
2nd Team Sprint Oceania Championships NZL
5th Keirin Oceania Championships NZL

2009
1st Team Sprint 2009-10 UCI Track World Cup AUS
1st Sprint Oceania Championships AUS
1st Team Sprint Oceania Championships AUS
2nd sprint Australian Track Championships SA
2nd team sprint Australian Track Championships SA
2nd Team Sprint 2008-09 UCI Track World Cup COL
4th Team Sprint World Championships POL
7th Keirin Oceania Championships AUS
21st Keirin World Championships POL
23rd Sprint World Championships POL

2008
1st Team Sprint 2008-09 UCI Track World Cup AUS
1st Team Sprint Oceania Championships NZL
3rd Sprint Oceania Championships NZL
3rd Keirin Australian Championships NSW
3rd Team Sprint Australian Championships NSW
4th Team Sprint Olympic Games CHN
4th Team Sprint Track World Cup USA
5th Sprint Australian Championships NSW
5th Team Sprint World Championships GBR
6th Keirin Oceania Championships NZL
13th Sprint 2008-09 UCI Track World Cup COL
15th Keirin 2008-09 UCI Track World Cup COL
28th Sprint World Championships GBR

2007
1st Team Sprint Track World Cup AUS
2nd Team Sprint Oceania Championships AUS
3rd Keirin Australian Championships NSW
3rd Team Sprint Launceston Carnival TAS
3rd Sprint Intl Sprint Grand Prix II USA
4th Team Sprint Track World Cup CHN
4th Team Sprint Track World Cup GBR
4th Sprint Oceania Championships AUS
4th Team Sprint Latrobe Carnival TAS
5th Team Sprint Track World CUP USA
5th Sprint Australian Championships NSW
5th Team Sprint Australian Championships NSW
6th Time Trial Australian Championships NSW
7th Keirin Oceania Championships AUS
7th Sprint Madison Cup USA
8th Keirin Festival of Speed USA
9th Sprint Track World Cup GBR
9th Sprint Latrobe Carnival TAS
12th Sprint Launceston Carnival TAS
15th Keirin Air Products Night USA
25th Sprint Track World Cup USA
25th Sprint Track World Cup AUS

2006
1st U19 Keirin Australian Track Championships SA
2nd Team Sprint World Junior Track Championships BEL
2nd Team Sprint GP von Deutschland im Sprint GER
3rd Sprint World Junior Track Championships BEL
3rd U19 Sprint Australian Track Championships SA
7th Keirin World Junior Track Championships BEL
8th Team Sprint Track World Cup AUS
12th Sprint Track World Cup AUS
13th Sprint GP von Deutschland im Sprint GER

2005
1st U19 Sprint Australian Titles SA
1st Keirin Olympic Youth Festival AUS
1st Team Sprint Olympic Youth Festival AUS
2nd Scratch Race Qld Summer of Cycling QLD
2nd Derby Qld Summer of Cycling QLD
2nd U19 Keirin Australian Titles SA
2nd U19 1 Lap Time Trial Australian Titles SA
2nd Sprint Olympic Youth Festival AUS
2nd 1 km Time Trial Olympic Youth Festival AUS
3rd Team Sprint World Junior Track Titles AUT
3rd U19 Team Sprint Oceania Titles AUS
4th U19 Sprint Oceania Titles AUS
5th U19 1 km Time Trial Australian Titles SA
5th U19 Keirin Oceania Titles AUS
7th Keirin World Junior Track Titles AUT

2004
3rd U17 Sprint Australian Titles TAS
4th U17 Scratch Race Australian Titles TAS
5th U17 500m Time Trial Australian Titles TAS
6th U17 1 Lap Time Trial Australian Titles TAS

2002
3rd U15 Time Trial Australian Titles NT
5th U15 Flying 200m Australian Titles NT
5th U15 Sprint Australian Titles NT

References

External links
 Australian Olympic Committee profile

1988 births
Living people
Australian male cyclists
Australian track cyclists
Cyclists from New South Wales
Cyclists at the 2008 Summer Olympics
Olympic cyclists of Australia
Sportsmen from New South Wales
Australian Institute of Sport cyclists
Cyclists at the 2010 Commonwealth Games
Commonwealth Games medallists in cycling
Commonwealth Games gold medallists for Australia
ACT Academy of Sport alumni
Sportspeople from Albury
Medallists at the 2010 Commonwealth Games